ESPS may refer to

Espiritu Santo Parochial School, a private Catholic school in the Philippines.
European Social and Political Studies, a course at UCL.
The NATO ship prefix used for warships of the Spanish Navy